Asemoplus sierranus is a species of short-horned grasshopper in the family Acrididae. It is found in North America.

References

Further reading

 
 
 
 

Acrididae
Insects described in 1936